Apokayana is a genus of southeast Asian cellar spiders named after the Apo Kayan people of Indonesia and Malaysia. It was erected in 2018 for ten species transferred from Panjange after a molecular phylogenetic study of Pholcidae.

Species
 it contains ten species, all native to Borneo:
A. bako (Huber, 2011) – Malaysia (Borneo)
A. iban (Huber, 2011) – Malaysia (Borneo)
A. kapit (Huber, 2016) (type) – Malaysia (Borneo)
A. kubah (Huber, 2016) – Malaysia (Borneo)
A. niah (Huber, 2016) – Malaysia (Borneo)
A. nigrifrons (Deeleman-Reinhold & Deeleman, 1983) – Indonesia (Borneo)
A. pueh (Huber, 2016) – Malaysia (Borneo)
A. sedgwicki (Deeleman-Reinhold & Platnick, 1986) – Malaysia (Borneo)
A. seowi (Huber, 2016) – Malaysia (Borneo)
A. tahai (Huber, 2011) – Indonesia (Borneo)

See also
 Panjange
 Pholcus
 List of Pholcidae species

References

Further reading

Pholcidae genera
Spiders of Asia